Chordiant, formerly known as Chordiant Software and J. Frank Consulting, was an American software company which offered enterprise software to help other companies improve customer experience. Now owned by Pegasystems, they were headquartered in Cupertino, California.

Chordiant provided Business Process Management (BPM), Customer relationship management (CRM), and Enterprise Decision Management (EDM) software, which enables building applications that enhances customer interaction. Applications built using the company's framework were widely used by large organisations in the United States and Europe.

History
Chordiant originally began under the name J. Frank Consulting, a consulting company. In 1997, they transformed into a software company and re-branded as Chordiant Software. In February 2000, they went public and traded under NASDAQ. The company's stock hit an initial high point of $53 shortly after going public, but soon crashed to single digits months later as the software industry in general suffered a significant decline.

Initially, Chordiant's software was developed on Forte 4GL platform. After seeing the promise of the emerging Java EE technologies, the company moved their software to a Java-based platform and became one of the first packaged enterprise software vendors to ship a completely Java EE-based product suite.

On March 15, 2010, Pegasystems, a competing company, announced it had acquired Chordiant for a price of approximately $161.5 million.

References

External links
Official website

Software companies based in the San Francisco Bay Area
Defunct companies based in the San Francisco Bay Area
Companies based in Cupertino, California
Software companies established in 1997
Software companies disestablished in 2010
Customer relationship management software companies
Defunct software companies of the United States
2010 mergers and acquisitions